A human visual system model (HVS model) is used by image processing, video processing and computer vision experts to deal with biological and psychological processes that are not yet fully understood.  Such a model is used to simplify the behaviours of what is a very complex system. As our knowledge of the true visual system improves, the model is updated.

Psychovisual study is the study of the psychology of vision.

The human visual system model can be used to produce desired effects in perception and vision. Examples of using an HVS model include color television, lossy compression, and Cathode-ray tube (CRT) television.

Originally it was thought that colour television required too high a bandwidth for the then available technology. Then it was noticed that the colour resolution of the HVS was much lower than the brightness resolution; this allowed colour to be squeezed into the signal by chroma subsampling.

Another example is lossy image compression, like JPEG. Our HVS model says that we cannot see high frequency detail so in JPEG we can quantise these components without a perceptible loss of quality. Similar concepts are applied in audio compression, where sound frequencies inaudible to humans are bandstop filtered.

Several HVS features are derived from evolution, when we needed to defend ourselves or hunt for food. We often see demonstrations of HVS features when we are looking at optical illusions.

Block diagram of HVS

Assumptions about the HVS

 Low-pass filter characteristic (limited number of rods in human eye): see Mach bands
 Lack of colour resolution (fewer cones in human eye than rods)
 Motion sensitivity 
 More sensitive in peripheral vision
 Stronger than texture sensitivity, e.g. viewing a camouflaged animal
 Texture stronger than disparity  3D depth resolution does not need to be so accurate
 Integral Face recognition (babies smile at faces)
 Depth inverted face looks normal (facial features overrule depth information)
 Upside down face with inverted mouth and eyes looks normal

Examples of taking advantage of an HVS model

 Flicker frequency of film and television using persistence of vision to fool viewer into seeing a continuous image
 Interlaced television painting half images to give the impression of a higher flicker frequency
 Colour television (chrominance at half resolution of luminance corresponding to proportions of rods and cones in eye)
 Image compression (difficult to see higher frequencies more harshly quantised)
 Motion estimation (use luminance and ignore colour)
 Watermarking and Steganography

See also
 Psychoacoustics
 Visual system
 Visual perception
 Depth perception

References

Computer vision